The Hanghai line is a line of the Hangzhou Metro that connects the cities Hangzhou and Haining in Zhejiang, China. The line began construction in late 2016 and opened on 28 June 2021.

Opening timeline
In November 2012, the Haining Municipal Government started preliminary work on the project. In December of the same year, an agreement was signed with the Yuhang District of Hangzhou.

In February 2013, the Zhejiang Provincial Development and Reform Commission submitted the "Recent Construction Plan for the Intercity Railway in the Metropolitan Area of Zhejiang Province" to the National Development and Reform Commission, the plan includes the Hangzhou-Haining Intercity Railway. This plan was approved by the NDRC on December 16, 2014. construction started on the first section of the Hangzhou–Haining intercity railway project between Chang'an to Zhouwangmiao Stations on December 15, 2016.

Stations
Notes on service Routes:

 L: Local service
 Ex: Express service, only trains toward Linping South Railway Station stop at Hainingxi Railway Stations (↑), and those toward International Campus, ZJU stop at Chang'an (Dongfang College) (↓)

References

Hangzhou Metro
Railway lines opened in 2021
1500 V DC railway electrification